Helen Frances Cullen (January 4, 1919 – August 25, 2007) was an American mathematician specializing in topology. She worked for many years as a professor of mathematics at the University of Massachusetts Amherst and was the first female faculty member in the mathematics department at Amherst. She was known as the author of the book Introduction to General Topology (Heath, 1968),
as well as for her outspoken antisemitism.

Education and career
Cullen was born in Dorchester, Massachusetts, and studied at the Boston Latin School and Radcliffe College.
She earned a master's degree at the University of Michigan in 1944,
and completed her Ph.D. at Michigan in 1950. Her dissertation, A Set of Parabolic Regular Curve Families Filling the Plane and Certain Related Reimann Surfaces, was supervised by Wilfred Kaplan. She was a faculty member in the department of mathematics at Amherst from 1949 until her retirement as a professor emerita in 1992.

Recognition
In 1998 the Bostin Latin School listed her as one of their outstanding alumnae.

References

1919 births
2007 deaths
20th-century American mathematicians
American women mathematicians
Topologists
Radcliffe College alumni
University of Michigan alumni
University of Massachusetts Amherst faculty
20th-century women mathematicians
20th-century American women
21st-century American women